Charles Brooking 'Brook' Hannah (28 September 1874 – 14 January 1961) was a former Australian rules footballer who played with Carlton in the Victorian Football League (VFL).		

After retiring from playing football, Hannah joined the China Inland Mission as an ordained missionary, and served as an assistant superintendent to Bishop Mowll of the Anglican Diocese of Szechwan. He survived the attacks on foreign Christian missionaries during the Boxer Rebellion and served as a missionary for over 50 years before retiring to Tunbridge Wells in England with his wife, May, an English-born missionary.

See also 
 Protestantism in Sichuan
 Anglicanism in Sichuan

Notes

External links 
		
Brook Hannah's profile at Blueseum

1874 births
1961 deaths
Carlton Football Club (VFA) players
Carlton Football Club players
Australian rules footballers from Melbourne
Australian Protestant missionaries
Protestant missionaries in Sichuan
Australian expatriate sportspeople in China
Diocese of Szechwan